Peter Huban (born 5 July 1976) is an Irish retired hurler who played as a full-back for the Galway senior team.

Born in Kinvara, County Galway, Huban first played competitive hurling during his schooling at Our Lady's College in Gort. He arrived on the inter-county scene at the age of seventeen when he first linked up with the Galway minor team, before later joining the under-21 side. He made his senior debut during the 1999 championship. Huban enjoyed a brief career with Galway and ended his career without silverware.

At the international level, Huban has played for the composite rules shinty-hurling team at the under-21 level, captaining his country to the title in 1996. At the club level, he enjoyed a lengthy career with Kinvara.

Throughout his inter-county career, Huban made 1 championship appearance for Galway. His retirement came following the conclusion of the 1999 championship.

Honours

Team

Our Lady's College
Connacht Senior Colleges Hurling Championship (1): 1993

Galway
All-Ireland Under-21 Hurling Championship (1): 1996 (c)
All-Ireland Minor Hurling Championship (1): 1994

Ireland
Composite Rules Under-21 Shinty–Hurling (1): 1996 (c)

References

1976 births
Living people
Kinvara hurlers
Galway inter-county hurlers
Hurling backs